Limperich Nord is a Bonn Stadtbahn tram stop served by lines 62 and 65 in the district of Bonn Beuel.

Bonn Straßenbahn stations